Kosmos 27 ( meaning Cosmos 27), also known as Zond 3MV-1 No.3 was a space mission intended as a Venus impact probe. The spacecraft was launched by a Molniya 8K78 carrier rocket from Baikonur. The Blok L stage and probe reached Earth orbit successfully, but the attitude control system failed to operate.

Launch 

Kosmos 27 was launched at 03:24:43 GMT on 27 March 1964, atop a Molniya 8K78 s/n T15000-27 carrier rocket flying from Site 1/5 at the Baikonur Cosmodrome.

Spacecraft 

Kosmos 27 was a "third-generation" deep space planetary probes of the 3MV series of the Soviet Union. The Soviet engineers planned four types of the 3MV, the 3MV-1 (for Venus impact), 3MV-2 (for Venus flyby), 3MV-3 (for Mars impact), and 3MV-4 (for Mars flyby). The primary difference over the second-generation was vastly improved (and in many cases doubled) orientation system elements as well as improved onboard propulsion systems. While these four versions were meant to study Mars and Venus.

Mission 

The probe was the first dedicated 3MV spacecraft that the Soviets launched (earlier missions had been of the test "Object-Probe" versions as Kosmos 21). It was designed to accomplish atmospheric entry into Venus followed by descent and impact. The spacecraft successfully reached Earth orbit but failed to leave for Venus when the Blok L upper stage malfunctioned. The upper stage lost stable attitude due to a failure in the circuit of the power supply circuit that powered the valves for the attitude control system; hence, the stage remained uncontrollable and not ready to initiate a burn to leave Earth orbit. The problem was traced to a design error, the examination of telemetry data found that the failure was due to a design flaw in the circuitry of the BOZ unit, which resulted in power not being transferred to the attitude control jets on the Blok L stage, rather than one related to quality control. The spacecraft burned up in Earth's atmosphere the following day, on 28 March 1964. If successful, this mission would have been given a "Venera" designation.

See also

 List of missions to Venus

References 

Kosmos satellites
Venera program
Spacecraft launched in 1964
Spacecraft which reentered in 1964
3MV